Paula Pell (born April 15, 1963) is an American writer, actress, comedian, and producer, best known for her work writing for the sketch series Saturday Night Live, being recognized with a Primetime Emmy Award for Outstanding Writing for a Variety, Music or Comedy Program and seven Writers Guild of America Awards. In 2019 Pell was honored with the Herb Sargent Award for Comedy Excellence.

Pell has produced, written, and performed in numerous TV series, including 30 Rock, A.P. Bio, Love, and Mapleworth Murders, and has worked as a writer for awards ceremonies like the Academy Awards, the Golden Globes and the MTV Video Music Awards. As a voiceover artist, she has voiced characters in Inside Out, Big Mouth, and Bless the Harts. Pell has also appeared in several films and TV series, including Sisters, Other People, and Wine Country. Since 2021, Pell has been a main cast member on the Peacock original series Girls5eva.

Biography 
Born in Joliet, Illinois, Pell wanted to be an actor from an early age. She studied acting and visual art at Orlando's Seminole Community College and the University of Tennessee at Knoxville. She took a job at Walt Disney World, working in the nightclubs of the resort's adults-only Pleasure Island section.

Pell was a writer for Saturday Night Live from 1995 to 2013. She is credited with creating some of its memorable characters, such as Debbie Downer, the Culps, Justin Timberlake's Omeletteville mascot, and the Spartan Cheerleaders, among others. She also was a producer and writer for the sitcom 30 Rock, and is credited with writing the episodes "Argus" and "Floyd". In 2006, a pilot she wrote, Thick and Thin, was picked up by NBC for 13 episodes, with Pell as executive producer, but it never aired in the United States. Pell has worked with Judd Apatow providing additional writing for the films Bridesmaids and This is 40.

As an actress, Pell appeared in several episodes of 30 Rock as the wife of Pete Hornberger and played the mother of Ron Swanson in a 2011 episode of Parks and Recreation. She has also appeared as an extra or in bit parts in dozens of SNL sketches. She voices Gadget Gal in the Hulu original series The Awesomes.

She has a small cameo in the 2013 comedy film Anchorman 2: The Legend Continues. She co-created the web series Hudson Valley Ballers with fellow SNL writer and long-time friend James Anderson with whom she also co-stars. Tina Fey produced and starred in Pell's first feature screenplay, Sisters (2015). Pell also played the dream producer and Mom's Anger in the 2015 Pixar film Inside Out. From 2016–2018, she guest-starred in the TV series Love as Erika. She also played a character based on Elaine Stritch in the mockumentary musical episode Co-op on Documentary Now! She appeared in one episode of Unbreakable Kimmy Schmidt in 2017, season 3 episode 10. She plays Helen Henry DeMarcus on the show, A.P. Bio. She also plays Aunt Mo in the Showtime series SMILF.

Pell co-starred alongside several other Saturday Night Live alumnae in the 2019 Netflix original comedy Wine Country.

On August 10, 2020, the comedy-mystery Mapleworth Murders, which she also co-wrote and executive produced, aired on Quibi. Pell was nominated at the Primetime Emmy Award for Outstanding Actress in a Short Form Comedy or Drama Series for her performance. Between 2020 and 2021, Pell voiced several characters in the animated series Bless the Harts.

In 2021, she currently stars as Gloria McManus in the Peacock comedy series Girls5eva.

Personal life 
Pell is openly gay. She was married for 17 years before getting divorced. She later married Janine Brito on November 13, 2020.

Filmography

Film

Television

Producer and screenwriter

Awards and nominations

References

External links
 

1963 births
American comedy writers
American women comedians
American film actresses
American television actresses
American voice actresses
American television producers
American women television producers
American television writers
American lesbian actresses
American lesbian writers
American LGBT screenwriters
Lesbian comedians
LGBT people from Illinois
Living people
21st-century American women writers
21st-century American comedians
American women television writers
21st-century American screenwriters
American LGBT comedians